Largest ships or biggest ships may refer to:
List of longest ships
List of largest ships by gross tonnage